Shakin is a rural locality (a khutor) and the administrative center of Shakinskoye Rural Settlement, Kumylzhensky District, Volgograd Oblast, Russia. The population was 635 as of 2010. There are 15 streets.

Geography 
Shakin is located in forest steppe, on Khopyorsko-Buzulukskaya Plain, on the bank of the Rastverdyayevka River, 36 km west of Kumylzhenskaya (the district's administrative centre) by road. Slashchevskaya is the nearest rural locality.

References 

Rural localities in Kumylzhensky District